The St. Onuphrius Monastery is an Orthodox monastery for women located in the potter's field (Akeldama in Aramean) that the Jewish elders purchased with the thirty pieces of silver returned by Judas Iscariot that had been given for betraying Jesus. The location is south of East Jerusalem and on the southern slope of the Gehenna valley, close to the Kidron Valley. Subject to the Greek Orthodox Church of Jerusalem, it is named after the fourth-century anchorite monk Saint Onuphrius.

History 

The monastery was built in 1892 on the site of an early Christian graveyard, consisting of niches hewn into the rock face; during the fourth century, this is where Saint Onuphrius the Anchorite would sit in prayer. In addition to the cave occupied by Saint Onuphrius, there is the Cave of the Apostles, where the Apostles are said to have hidden during the Crucifixion. An underground church has existed since the time of Constantine I (306–312), and has been enlarged over the centuries. It has been consecrated to Saint Onuphrius, with the grottoes found in the southern part of the church. From this period, the Orthodox have conserved the custom of dedicating a number of funeral chapels to Saint Onuphrius.

The present monastery was built in the nineteenth century. It includes terraces that dominate the floor of the valley.

Gallery

References

Bibliography
(In Russian) Archimandrite Léonide (Kavéline), La vieille ville de Jérusalem et ses environs, Indrik, 2008.

Source
Translated from French, which in turn was 

Greek Orthodox monasteries
Eastern Orthodox monasteries in Israel
Greek Orthodoxy in the Middle East